Bis(2-methoxyethyl) phthalate, also commonly di(2-methoxyethyl) phthalate (DMEP), is a phthalate ester baring 2-methoxyethanol groups. Historically it was used as a plasticizer in cellulose acetate plastics, it is now largely banned owing to concerns over its effects to human health.

References

Phthalate esters
Ethers
Methoxy compounds